Janet Brown (1923–2011) was a Scottish actress, comedian and impressionist.

Janet Brown may refer to:
 Janet H. Brown, executive director of the Commission on Presidential Debates in the United States
 Janet Brown (murder victim) (1944–1995), English nurse murdered in 1995

See also
 Janet Browne (born 1950), British historian of science